Basil Samuel Foster (12 February 1882 – 28 September 1959) was an English actor and cricketer who played 34 first-class matches in the early 20th century. He was born in Malvern, Worcestershire, and died in Pield Heath, Hillingdon, Middlesex, aged 77.  He was the inspiration for the Wodehouse character, Catsmeat Potter-Pirbright, having become a stage actor so that he could also play county cricket.

Cricket career

One of the seven Foster brothers who played for Worcestershire, he made his first-class debut for that county against Kent in August 1902, but scored only 4 and 0 as Worcestershire lost by nine wickets. He played against Surrey a few days later, taking three catches, and against Hampshire the following June, but made ducks in both his innings.

Foster did not play first-class cricket again until 1906, when he made 27 and 26 for Marylebone Cricket Club (MCC) against Worcestershire at Lord's. Between then and early May 1912, he played mostly for MCC, making 15 appearances for them in all while turning out only four more times for Worcestershire. It was for MCC that he made his two half-centuries: 86 (from number eight) against the South Africans in 1907, and 74 against Leicestershire in 1910.

After his last match for MCC, Foster returned exclusively to county cricket, but now with Middlesex. For his new county he made 12 first-class appearances, but in 15 innings never scored more than 35. His final game came against Kent in late August, but only one day's play was possible in the match and Foster made just 8 in his only innings before being caught and bowled by Woolley.

Personal life 
Foster was married to actress Gwendoline Brogden and Lillian F. Norton.

References

External links
 

1882 births
1959 deaths
English cricketers
Marylebone Cricket Club cricketers
Middlesex cricketers
People educated at Malvern College
People from Malvern, Worcestershire
Worcestershire cricketers
Basil
Sportspeople from Worcestershire